Osbaldo Lupo Lastra García (born 12 June 1983) is an Ecuadorian footballer who plays as a midfielder.

Lastra was called up for the 2015 Copa América making the cut for the final 23 this time around.

References

External links
 ecuafutbol.org
 
 

1983 births
Living people
People from San Lorenzo, Ecuador
Association football midfielders
Ecuadorian footballers
C.S.D. Independiente del Valle footballers
S.D. Aucas footballers
Deportivo Azogues footballers
C.S.D. Macará footballers
C.S. Emelec footballers
Barcelona S.C. footballers
Ecuadorian Serie A players
Ecuador international footballers
2015 Copa América players